The 1991 Hanes 500 was the eighth stock car race of the 1991 NASCAR Winston Cup Series and the 42nd iteration of the event. The race was held on Sunday, April 28, 1991, before an audience of 44,000 in Martinsville, Virginia at Martinsville Speedway, a  permanent oval-shaped short track. The race took the scheduled 500 laps to complete. With the assist of a late caution, on the final restart with 38 laps to go in the race, Richard Childress Racing driver Dale Earnhardt would manage to mount a late-race charge to the lead on the ensuing restart to take his 50th career NASCAR Winston Cup Series victory and his second victory of the season. To fill out the top three, SABCO Racing driver Kyle Petty and owner-driver Darrell Waltrip would finish second and third, respectively.

Background 

Martinsville Speedway is an NASCAR-owned stock car racing track located in Henry County, in Ridgeway, Virginia, just to the south of Martinsville. At 0.526 miles (0.847 km) in length, it is the shortest track in the NASCAR Cup Series. The track was also one of the first paved oval tracks in NASCAR, being built in 1947 by H. Clay Earles. It is also the only remaining race track that has been on the NASCAR circuit from its beginning in 1948.

Entry list 

 (R) denotes rookie driver.

Qualifying 
Qualifying was originally scheduled to be split into two rounds. The first round was held on Friday, April 27, at 3:00 PM EST. Originally, the first 20 positions were going to be determined by first round qualifying, with positions 21-30 meant to be determined the following day on Saturday, April 28. However, due to rain, the second round was cancelled. As a result, the rest of the starting lineup was set using the results from the first round. Depending on who needed it, a select amount of positions were given to cars who had not otherwise qualified but were high enough in owner's points; up to two were given.  If needed, a past champion who did not qualify on either time or provisionals could use a champion's provisional, adding one more spot to the field.

Five drivers would fail to qualify.

Full qualifying results

Race results

Standings after the race 

Drivers' Championship standings

Note: Only the first 10 positions are included for the driver standings.

References 

1991 NASCAR Winston Cup Series
NASCAR races at Martinsville Speedway
April 1991 sports events in the United States
1991 in sports in Virginia